Mian Mujtaba Shuja-ur-Rehman is a Pakistani politician who was a member of the Provincial Assembly of the Punjab, from 2002 to May 2018 and from August 2018 till January 2023.

Early life and education
He was born on 1 September 1967 in Lahore.

He has the degree  of Master of Public Administration  which he obtained in 1993 from University of the Punjab.

Political career

He was elected to the Provincial Assembly of the Punjab as a candidate of Pakistan Muslim League (N) (PML-N) from Constituency PP-141 (Lahore-V) in 2002 Pakistani general election. He received 20,017 votes and defeated Mian Liaqat Ali, a candidate of Pakistan Peoples Party (PPP).

He was re-elected uncontested to the Provincial Assembly of the Punjab as a candidate of PML-N from Constituency PP-141 (Lahore-V) in 2008 Pakistani general election.  During his tenure as Member of the Punjab Assembly, he remained Provincial Minister of Punjab for Excise and Taxation, Finance, Higher Education, School Education, Literacy & Non-formal Basic Education, and Transport.

He was re-elected to the Provincial Assembly of the Punjab as a candidate of PML-N from Constituency PP-141 (Lahore-V) in 2013 Pakistani general election. He received 58,857 votes and defeated Choudhry Muhammad Nawaz Net, a candidate of Pakistan Tehreek-e-Insaf (PTI). In June 2013, he was inducted into the provincial cabinet of Chief Minister Shahbaz Sharif and was made Provincial Minister of Punjab for Finance with the additional portfolio of Excise and Taxation. He remained Minister for Finance from June 2013 to May 2015. In October 2014, he was given the additional portfolio Minister for Law and Parliamentary Affairs where he served until May 2015. In a cabinet reshuffle in November 2016, he was given the additional portfolio of Information and Culture besides Excise and Taxation.

He was re-elected to Provincial Assembly of the Punjab as a candidate of PML-N from Constituency PP-147 (Lahore-IV) in 2018 Pakistani general election.

References

Living people
Punjab MPAs 2013–2018
1967 births
Pakistan Muslim League (N) MPAs (Punjab)
Punjab MPAs 2002–2007
Punjab MPAs 2008–2013
Punjab MPAs 2018–2023